Parade Ground is a multi-use stadium in Cockburn Town, Grand Turk, Turks and Caicos Islands. It is currently used for athletics, cricket, rugby union and football competitions.

References

External links 
 Photos
 Wikimapia

Football venues in the Turks and Caicos Islands
Athletics (track and field) venues in the Turks and Caicos Islands
Cricket grounds in the Turks and Caicos Islands
Rugby union stadiums in the Turks and Caicos Islands
Grand Turk Island
Buildings and structures in Cockburn Town